Rhythm Doubles is a studio album by Sly and Robbie. It was nominated for Best Reggae Album at the 49th Annual Grammy Awards (Held on February 11, 2007).

Track listing
 "El Cumbanchero" - 5:12 featuring the Taxi Gang
 "Bounce" - 4:18 featuring Wyclef Jean & Bounty Killer
 "Memories" - Ghetto Heaven"-3:52 featuring Mitch & Scantana
 "Walk Out" - 3:47 featuring Elephant Man
 "Liar" - 4:04 featuring Lady Saw
 "Black People" - 3:25 featuring Bounty Killer
 "Party Hot" - 4:01 featuring Conrad Crystal, Suga Roy & Yellowman
 "My Girl" - 3:56 featuring Chaka Demus & Pliers
 "Love Sound" - 5:04 featuring Alaine & Beres Hammond
 "Star" - 3:53 featuring T.O.K.
 "There for You" - 4:54 featuring Annette Brissett & Beres Hammond
 "Milk & Honey" - 4:02 featuring Ali Campbell & Luciano
 "Heavy Load" - 3:54 featuring Ras Abijah
 "Just to Know" - 4:00 featuring Maxi Priest
 "Big Up" - 4:04 featuring Wayne Marshall
 "Searching" - 4:47 featuring Trini
 "Mango Tongo" - 4:17 featuring the Taxi Gang
 "Sun Shine" (bonus track) - 3:56 featuring T.O.K.

References

2006 albums
Sly and Robbie albums